Techiman Senior High School is a second cycle co-education institution located in Techiman, Bono East Region of Ghana. It has its slogan to be SUPER TESS or Abusuafo.. It is a Grade B school.

Establishment 
Former president of Ghana, Kwame Nkrumah established the school in November 1963 under the Ghana Education Trust with 71 students of which 53 were boys and 18 were girls.

Enrollment 
As of 2013, the school had a student population of about  2,786 which consisted of 1671 boys and 1115 girls.

Notable alumni 

Kwadwo Asare-Baffour Acheampong(KABA), Ghanaian journalist

Headmasters 

 Moses Kofi Boakye (2013-2016)
 Jacob Afful (2016 - present)

References 

Schools in Ghana
Educational institutions established in 1963
1963 establishments in Ghana
Bono East Region